Enorma is a genus of bacteria from the family of Coriobacteriaceae.

References

Coriobacteriaceae
Bacteria genera